Isopropyl iodide is the organoiodine compound with the formula (CH3)2CHI.  It is colorless, flammable, and volatile. Organic iodides are light-sensitive and take on a yellow colour upon storage, owing to the formation of iodine.

Preparation
Isopropyl iodide is prepared by iodination of isopropyl alcohol using hydrogen iodide or, equivalently, with a mixture of glycerol, iodine, and phosphorus. An alternative preparation involves the reaction of 2-propyl bromide with an acetone solution of sodium iodide (Finkelstein reaction):
(CH3)2CHBr  +  NaI   →   (CH3)2CHI  +  NaBr

References

Iodoalkanes
Isopropyl compounds
Iodides